Thomas Augustine Shale (10 September 1864 in Bilston, Staffordshire – 24 June 1953 in Brighton, Sussex) was a British comic actor who appeared in vaudeville, theatre, pantomime and films during the late 19th and early 20th centuries.

Making his first professional appearance in 1885, he was a regular in pantomime, playing 'Buttons' in Cinderella and King Stoneybrokish in Jack and the Beanstalk with George Robey and Barry Lupino. He regularly toured in productions in Great Britain and the United States.

His films included The Night Porter (1930), Never Trouble Trouble (1931) and The Good Companions (1933).

His brother Edward Shale (1861-1926) was a London-based stage manager for over 20 years.

References

External links
Photograph of Shale as 'Buttons' in Cinderella

1864 births
1953 deaths
English male stage actors
English male film actors
20th-century English male actors